Arthur Leonard Bamford (1879 – 1950), known as Arthur Leonard, was an English footballer who played in the Football League for Small Heath and Stoke.

Career
Leonard, then known by his original surname of Bamford, signed for Leicester Fosse in 1895, but walked out on them. After playing for Rushden Town and Sheppey United, Small Heath spotted Leonard playing for Glentoran and signed him on the spot for a fee of £120. However, representatives of Leicester recognised him as their absent player, and when questioned as to the facts, he disappeared again. Persuaded to return to Birmingham, he admitted to being Bamford, and the matter was settled by Small Heath paying Leicester a further £20 to complete the transfer. In 1902–03 he was the club's top scorer with 16 goals.

Leonard then joined Stoke in January 1904 and played 14 matches in two seasons scoring three goals. After a short spell in Scotland with St Bernard's he moved to the Southern League with Clapton Orient, Plymouth Argyle before ending his career with Reading.

Career statistics
Source:

References

External links
 Arthur Leonard profile at greensonscreen.co.uk

1874 births
1921 deaths
Footballers from Leicester
English footballers
Association football forwards
Leicester City F.C. players
Rushden Town F.C. players
Sheppey United F.C. players
Glentoran F.C. players
Birmingham City F.C. players
Stoke City F.C. players
St Bernard's F.C. players
Leyton Orient F.C. players
Plymouth Argyle F.C. players
Reading F.C. players
English Football League players
Southern Football League players
Place of death missing